The city of Ottawa, Canada held municipal elections on December 6, 1926 to elect members of the 1927 Ottawa City Council.

Mayor of Ottawa
Incumbent mayor John P. Balharrie is re-elected, defeating future mayors Patrick Nolan (a former alderman) and controller Frank H. Plant. Balharrie won eight of the city's nine wards, losing just Victoria Ward to Nolan.

Plebiscites
Property owners voted against a plebiscite which would have raised $330,000 to pay for the removal of cross-town tracks. 

Voters approved a plebiscite to move public school board elections from being elected by ward to an at-large voting system.

Ottawa Board of Control
(4 elected)

Ottawa City Council
(2 elected from each ward)

References
Ottawa Citizen, December 7, 1926

Municipal elections in Ottawa
1926 elections in Canada
1920s in Ottawa
1926 in Ontario